L. albus  may refer to:
 Lethrinops albus, a fish species endemic to Lake Malawi
 Loxechinus albus, a sea urchin species found in Chile
 Luciogobius albus, a fish species
 Lupinus albus, a traditional white lupin pulse species cultivated in the Mediterranean region

See also
 Albus (disambiguation)